Club Classics Vol. One (USA title: Keep On Movin') is the debut album by the British group Soul II Soul. Released in 1989, the album featured the group's hit singles "Keep on Movin'" and "Back to Life (However Do You Want Me)", the latter of which was a UK number-one hit and the fifth best-selling single in the UK that year. The album also reached number one and was certified triple platinum by the British Phonographic Industry for sales in excess of 900,000 copies.

In the United States, the album reached the Top 20. The single "Back to Life" was also a Top 10 hit in the US and was certified Platinum. It found stronger success with R&B music listeners in the US, as the album went to No. 1 on the Top R&B Albums chart, and the title track and "Back to Life" were number-one R&B hit singles.

Reception

Club Classics Vol. One reached number one in the United Kingdom and was certified triple platinum by the British Phonographic Industry for sales in excess of 900,000 copies. In the United States, the album reached the Top 20 in the main chart, and number one on the Top R&B Albums chart. It went on to be certified double platinum by the Recording Industry Association of America for sales in excess of two million copies.

Legacy
Alex Henderson, in a retrospective review for AllMusic, commented that the musical influences ranged from "Chic to hip hop to African music", and that the album was "among the most rewarding R&B releases of 1989".

In 2004, Q magazine placed Club Classics Vol. One at number 28 in its list of the 50 Greatest British Albums Ever. In 2006, the magazine placed the album at number 34 in its list of "40 Best Albums of the 1980s". In 2012, Slant Magazine placed the album at number 100 on its list of the best albums of the 1980s.

In late April 2021 Sky Arts included the album in episode two of its newly released Classic Albums series. The hour long broadcast featured newly released interviews with the band members and friends including Trevor Nelson.

Track listing

Charts

Weekly charts

Year-end charts

Certifications

See also
 List of number-one albums from the 1980s (UK)
 List of number-one R&B albums of 1989 (U.S.)

References

External links

Club Classics Vol. One (Adobe Flash) at Radio3Net (streamed copy where licensed)

1989 debut albums
Soul II Soul albums
Albums produced by Nellee Hooper
Virgin Records albums